Virgilia Lütz (March 27, 1869 –  June 8, 1949) was a German Catholic nun who is known for being the reigning Abbess of Nonnberg Abbey from 1921 until her death in 1949. She is known for her association with Maria von Trapp during the latter's time as a postulant at Nonnberg.

Biography
Lütz was born in the town of Sigmaringen, located in the state of Baden-Württemberg in Germany. She studied through the Archdiocese of Freiburg.

Upon her arrival at Nonnberg, which is of the Benedictine religious order, Lütz rose through the ranks, and became Abbess in 1921. Maria von Trapp (then Maria Kutschera) came to the Abbey in 1924 wanting to be a postulant and was accepted. In 1926, Lütz suggested that Maria take a job with retired naval officer Georg von Trapp and his seven children. Von Trapp's wife, Agathe Whitehead, had died in 1922, and he had written to the Abbey asking if there was a nun there that could work with his sick daughter, Maria. The Abbey is located roughly ten minutes from the von Trapp estate on the outskirts of Salzburg.

Maria eventually gave up her dream of entering her novitiate, marrying Von Trapp at the Abbey in 1927 with the permission and spiritual guidance of Lütz.

Lütz led the Abbey during World War II, beginning with Nazi Germany's annexation of Austria in 1938. During the war, religious institutions were typically left alone, but not deemed completely safe from harm or property searches. Many Catholic religious officials secretly opposed Nazi policies and helped those who were at risk for being sent to concentration camps.

Lütz died in 1949 at the age of 80, and is buried on the grounds of the Abbey. It is not known when she last saw Maria, as the Von Trapp family left Austria and immigrated to the United States. Upon Maria's arrival in the United States, she published her autobiography in 1949, which sparked widespread interest in her story. In the book, she writes about the Mother Abbess and her time at Nonnberg.

Portrayal in media
Lütz inspired the character of the “Mother Abbess”, portrayed by German actress Agnes Windeck, in the original 1956 feature-film on the von Trapp family. Her voice when singing was dubbed by Margery McKay.

In the 1959 Broadway musical The Sound of Music, Lütz was portrayed by Patricia Neway, who won the Tony Award for Best Featured Actress in a Musical for her performance. The song Climb Ev'ry Mountain, written by Rodgers and Hammerstein, is sung by the Mother Abbess to Maria, encouraging her to be strong and follow her heart.

In the 1965 film The Sound of Music, the Mother Abbess was portrayed by Peggy Wood, who was nominated for the Academy Award for Best Supporting Actress for her performance.

References 

1869 births
1949 deaths
19th-century German Roman Catholic nuns
German Roman Catholic abbesses
People from Sigmaringen
Musical theatre characters
20th-century German Roman Catholic nuns